Labastide-Dénat (Languedocien: La Bastida de Denat) is a former commune in the Tarn department in southern France. On 1 January 2017, it was merged into the commune Puygouzon.

See also
Communes of the Tarn department

References

Former communes of Tarn (department)
Populated places disestablished in 2017